Karlheinz Busen (born 5 April 1951) is a German civil engineer and politician of the Free Democratic Party (FDP) who has been serving as a member of the Bundestag from the state of North Rhine-Westphalia since 2017.

Early life and career 
Busen is a graduate engineer. From 1976, he operated his own company with eight employees.

Political career 
From 2012 until 2017, Busen served as a member of the State Parliament of North Rhine-Westphalia. 

Busen became a member of the Bundestag in the 2017 German federal election. In parliament, he serves as his parliamentary group’s spokesperson for hunting and forestry.

In the negotiations to form a so-called traffic light coalition of the Social Democratic Party (SPD), the Green Party and the FDP following the 2021 German elections, Busen was part of his party's delegation in the working group on environmental policy, co-chaired by Rita Schwarzelühr-Sutter, Steffi Lemke and Stefan Birkner.

References

External links 

  
 Bundestag biography 

 

1951 births
Living people
Members of the Bundestag for North Rhine-Westphalia
Members of the Bundestag 2017–2021
Members of the Bundestag 2021–2025
People from Gronau, North Rhine-Westphalia
Members of the Bundestag for the Free Democratic Party (Germany)